Arthur R. Gould (1857–1946) was a U.S. Senator from Maine from 1926 to 1931. Senator Gould may also refer to:

Ron Gould (politician) (born 1965), Arizona State Senate
Susan Gould (born 1929), Washington State Senate